Alster is a river of Bavaria and of Thuringia, Germany. It is a right tributary of the Itz, which it joins near Kaltenbrunn.

See also
List of rivers of Bavaria
List of rivers of Thuringia

References

Rivers of Bavaria
Rivers of Thuringia
Rivers of Germany